Middlefork Savanna is a of  nature preserve in Lake Forest, Illinois. Several biomes including oak savannas, dry-mesic prairies, wet-mesic prairies, marshes, deciduous woodlands, and sedge meadows as well as a portion of the North Branch of the Chicago River are found in the preserve. The Middlefork Savanna also contains  of the “highest quality tallgrass savanna of its kind” in the United States. Such ecosystems are globally endangered. The preserve includes 5.5 miles of gravel trails for hiking and cross-country skiing as well as 4.2 miles of trails for biking. It is managed by Lake County Forest Preserves.

History
Middlefork Savanna opened to the public in 2002. The last addition to the preserve was made in 2000.

It is named for the middle fork of the north branch of the Chicago River that passes through the area. The historic Elawa Farm, owned by the City of Lake Forest, is adjacent The preserve is inhabited by endangered species and includes 25 acres highest quality black soil savannah. Many bird species have been documented in the preserve.

The area was once part of a glacial lake. Lake Forest College students have studied at the preserve.

References

Further reading

External links
U.S. Geological Survey Map at the U.S. Geological Survey Map Website. Retrieved January 11, 2023.

Lake Forest, Illinois
Protected areas of Lake County, Illinois
2002 establishments in Illinois
Grasslands of Illinois